This is the discography of Canibus, an American rapper.

Studio albums

Collaboration albums
 The Horsemen Project (with Killah Priest, Kurupt & Ras Kass as the Hrsmn)
 Release date: October 20, 2003
 Record label: Think Differently Music/Proverbs Music Inc.
 Def Con Zero (with Phoenix Orion as Cloak-n-Dagga)
 Release date: October 25, 2005
 Record label: Head Trauma, First Kut
 In Gods We Trust, Crush Microphones to Dust (with Keith Murray as the Undergods)
 Release date: May 31, 2011
 Record label: RBC Records
 Microphone Land (with Jaximus)
 Release date: July 3, 2021

Collaboration EPs
 Canibus and Keith Murray Are the Undergods (with Keith Murray as the Undergods)
 Release date: September 29, 2009
 Record label: Sound Records and Entertainment
Canibus and Marty McKay EPs
Matrix Theory I 
Release Date: December 2018
Matrix Theory II
Release Date: March 2019
Matrix Theory III
Release Date: June 2019
Matrix Theory IV
Release Date: January 2020
Matrix Theory V 
Release Date: July 2021
C (with Pete Rock)
Release Date: April 2022

Compilation albums
 The Masterpiece Collection
 Release date: June 17, 2014
 Record label: Babygrande Records
 The Almighty Era V.1
 Release date: March 4, 2022
 Record label: Holy Toledo Productions

Independent albums
The Brainstream (2003)
My Name Is Nobody (2003)
Mic Club Mixtape Master Volume One (2005)
The Vitruvian Man (2005)

Singles

As lead artist

Selected guest appearances

References

Hip hop discographies
Discographies of American artists